E. L. Evans House is a historic home located at South Boston, Halifax County, Virginia. It was built in 1892, and is a large two-story, five bay, balloon-frame High Victorian style dwelling.  The front facade features a projecting center gable holding cutaway bays on both the first and second stories, a three-story tower on the northeast corner, and a curved, projecting gabled bay.  Also on the property is the contributing brick foundation for the former ice house.

It was listed on the National Register of Historic Places in 2008.

References

Houses on the National Register of Historic Places in Virginia
Victorian architecture in Virginia
Houses completed in 1892
Houses in Halifax County, Virginia
National Register of Historic Places in Halifax County, Virginia